Vortex may refer to any of these roller coasters:

 Vortex (California's Great America), a stand-up roller coaster at California's Great America in Santa Clara
 Vortex (Canada's Wonderland), a suspended roller coaster at Canada's Wonderland in Vaughan
 Vortex (Carowinds), a stand-up roller coaster at Carowinds in Charlotte, North Carolina
 Vortex (Kings Island), a steel roller coaster at Kings Island in Mason, Ohio